Wes King (born January 20, 1966) is an American contemporary Christian singer, songwriter, photographer, and musician. He is perhaps best known for his 1993 album The Robe. His demo material, a cassette tape named "Lonely Poet", is sung by other artists, such as Kim Hill. He briefly attended Covenant College outside of Chattanooga, Tennessee, in the late 1980s. He also led worship at Christian youth retreat camps.

Background
After picking up the guitar at the age of 14, Wes wrote his first songs two years later; after studying the Bible at Covenant College, he relocated to Franklin, Tennessee. Wes signed with Reunion Records and recorded his first solo LP The Ultimate Underlying No Denying Motivation in 1990. After issuing Sticks and Stones a year later, King resurfaced in 1993 with The Robe. 1995's Common Creed was his biggest hit to date, notching three CHR chart-toppers -- "Life Is Precious," "The Love of Christ" and the title cut. In 1997, King issued A Room Full of Stories, his most acclaimed effort yet followed by What Matters Most in 2000 which was released on Word Artisan.

In 2005 Wes was diagnosed with Lymphoma and underwent many months of extremely difficult treatments and years of side-effects. Wes is now cancer free and is feeling well enough to spend time in his studio again. 

Wes King's song "Good to Be Alive" is a song of celebration and thankfulness for the life the Lord has given him. Other free downloadable singles include, "Point to the Light", "My Dear Mother" (written as a dedication to his close mother who passed just months before), and "The Robe" (remixed/mash-up as "The Robe / Come as You Are" by Masaki).

Collaborations
King has collaborated with other artists on numerous occasions, most notably with artist Phil Keaggy on Invention (Keaggy, Dente & King).  Credits include:

 1989, "Talk About Life", composer, acoustic guitar Kim Hill
 1989, "Revival", composer David Mullen
 1991, "Brave Heart", arranger Kim Hill
 1992, "Angels of Mercy", composer Susan Ashton
 1993, "Orphans and Angels", background vocals, Julie Miller
 1993, "Matter of Time", background vocals, Nina Åström
 1994, "Walk On", composer, Susan Ashton
 1995, "Testimony", composer, Kim Hill
 1996, "Brother to Brother", guest artist, guitar, acoustic guitar, Michael Card
 1997, "Invention", bouzouki, composer, acoustic guitar, electric guitar, mandolin, vocals, background vocals, Phil Keaggy
 1998, "The Loving Kind", composer, guest artist, guitar, vocals, Cindy Morgan
 1999, "This Is Your Time", composer, guest artist, Michael W. Smith
 2001, "Worship", choir/chorus, composer, acoustic guitar, Michael W. Smith
 2002, "Woven in Time", composer, guest artist, classical guitar, Steve Green
 2002, "Worship Again", composer, Michael W. Smith
 2003, "Signatures", bass guitar, John Michael Talbot
 2004, "Healing Rain", composer, Michael W. Smith
 2004, "Beyond the Gates", composer, Cans
 2007, "It's a Wonderful Christmas", lyricist, Michael W. Smith
 2007, "Grounded", composer, Justin Adams
 2008, "It's Christmas", composer, Mandisa
 2010, "Who I Am", guitar, Carmen Liana
 2014, "The Spirit of Christmas", composer, Michael W. Smith
 2014, "Sovereign", acoustic guitar, Michael W. Smith

Photography
 2009, "Ceremony to the Sunset", photographer, Yawning Sons

Discography
1987: Lonely Poet (demo)
1990: The Ultimate Underlying No Denying Motivation (Reunion Records)
1991: Sticks and Stones  (Reunion Records)
1993: The Robe (Reunion Records)
1995: Common Creed (Reunion Records)
1997: A Room Full of Stories (Sparrow Records)
2001: What Matters Most (Word Records)

With Phil Keaggy and Scott Dente
 1997: Invention (Sparrow Records)

Credited
 1989: Charm Is Deceitful and Snake in the Grass (Kim Hill) on Talk About Life (Reunion Records)

Tributes
2005: Life Is Precious: A Wes King Tribute

References

External links

Living people
American performers of Christian music
Christian music songwriters
Calvinist and Reformed writers
1966 births
People from Barrow County, Georgia